Dunbeg, formerly known as Dunstaffnage ( or Dùn Staidhinis), is a village about  outside of Oban, Scotland. It has a population of just under 1,000.  It is home to the Scottish Association for Marine Science (SAMS), one of the primary marine science centres in the UK.  Also near Dunbeg is Dunstaffnage Castle, part of the Campbell Clan and is owned by the Captain of Dunstaffnage.

Archaeology 
Archaeological excavations in 2010, by Argyll Archaeology, in advance of the development of the European Marine Science Park found evidence that people were also living in the area from the Neolithic to the Early Historic periods. The archaeologists discovered funerary pyres, and an infant burial, that were in use for several generations during the Late Iron Age and a farmstead in use sometime between the late 7th to 9th centuries AD. The end of activity on the site  roughly coincides with documented attacks on Iona by Norse invaders in 795, 802, 806 and 825. A Norse presence in the areas was found in the form of a fragment of copper alloy Viking ring money by a metal detectorist before the excavation.

Landmarks

Primary School 
Dunbeg Primary School is a single storey building originally opened in 1960. In 2021 it had places for 141 children of all denominations from P1-7, it also provides preschool education with spaces for 20 3–5 year olds.

The Scottish Association for Marine Science 

It is one of Europe's leading marine science research organisations, one of the oldest oceanographic organisations in the world and is Scotland's largest and oldest independent marine science organisation.

Dunstaffnage Castle 

The castle dates back to the 13th century, making it one of Scotland's oldest stone castles, in a local group which includes Castle Sween and Castle Tioram.

Climate

See also
 Evonium

References

Villages in Argyll and Bute